Leucanopsis flavorufa is a moth of the family Erebidae. It was described by Walter Rothschild in 1910. It is found in Guyana, French Guiana, Ecuador., Venezuela and Costa Rica.

References

 

flavorufa
Moths described in 1910